Charles William Wantland (February 22, 1888 – March 31, 1964) was an American athlete and coach. Wantland served as a sports coach and athletic director, and dean at Central State Teachers College in Edmond, Oklahoma.

Early life and education
Wantland grew up in Purcell, Oklahoma. He attended Purcell High School and graduated in 1906. He attended the University of Oklahoma where Wantland participated on the football, baseball, track, and basketball teams.  In football, he played right halfback, was the kick returner and placekicker. He is perhaps best known for the 1908 game against Texas in which he returned a kick for 90 yards and a touchdown, part of a four touchdown performance to defeat the Longhorns. During the 1909–10 season he was the captain of the Oklahoma Sooners men's basketball team.

Coaching career

Early positions
After graduation from Oklahoma in 1910 with a B.A in economics, Wantland coached at Lindsay High School in 1910. After that year coach Bennie Owen tasked Wantland to be an assistant for the football team, and to coach the track squad. During this time Wantland was also a baseball umpire.

Central State
In 1912 Wantland was hired to lead the athletic program at Central State Normal School (later renamed Central State Teachers College, now the University of Central Oklahoma.) While at CSN he coached the football and basketball teams, and was also the dean of men at the college. It was during this time that he led Central into what would be known as the Golden Age of Central Football. He was instrumental in founding the first Oklahoma Intercollegiate Conference in which all normal schools in the state participated. He is known for defeating Oklahoma Methodist, (now Oklahoma City University) by a score of 183–0. During the 1924 season, Wantland had his greatest success, after a season opening loss to Southwestern (KS), he led the Bronchos to their only win over his alma mater the Oklahoma Sooners, shortly thereafter the Bronchos defeated eventual Southwest Conference champion Baylor in Dallas, on the way to a 9–1 record and the OIC crown.

Fired by Governor Murray
In 1930 former representative Alfalfa Bill Murray was campaigning to be governor.  During this time he urged public officials to actively support his candidacy. However, college president John Gorden Mitchell and Wantland refused to do so. Wantland chose to support Murray's rival, Frank Buttram. Mitchell claimed Murray "was his third choice for governor". Murray responded that Mitchell was his second choice for the presidency of Central State. When Murray was successful in his gubernatorial bid he swiftly fired both President Mitchell and Wantland. Wantland never returned to the coaching ranks.

Personal life
In 1922 Mrs. Wantland chose the Broncho as the mascot for CSTC. After being fired by Governor Murray, Wantland entered the oil supply business until his retirement in 1953. He died in 1964. Wantland was the namesake for two buildings on Central Oklahoma's campus, the former field house and current physical education building Wantland Hall, and the now Chad Richison Stadium the home for Broncho football was named Wantland Stadium in his honor from 1965–2021. In 1998 Wantland was named by the Purcell Register to the Purcell High School all-century team, the earliest player to make the list.

Head coaching record

College football

College basketball

See also
 William C. Wantland, Wantland's grandson
 Moore-Lindsay House

References

1888 births
1964 deaths
American football halfbacks
Basketball coaches from Oklahoma
Basketball players from Oklahoma
Central Oklahoma Bronchos athletic directors
Central Oklahoma Bronchos football coaches
Central Oklahoma Bronchos men's basketball coaches
Oklahoma Sooners football players
Oklahoma Sooners baseball players
Oklahoma Sooners football coaches
Oklahoma Sooners men's basketball players
Oklahoma Sooners men's track and field athletes
Oklahoma Sooners track and field coaches
High school football coaches in Oklahoma
People from Purcell, Oklahoma
Players of American football from Oklahoma
American men's basketball players